Pfitzneriana vogli is a moth of the family Hepialidae. It is found in Venezuela.

References

Moths described in 1952
Hepialidae